Carp's tit (Melaniparus carpi) or Carp's black tit, is a species of bird in the family Paridae. Some authors consider it a subspecies of the black tit. It is found throughout the Namibian savanna woodlands and the southern Angolan mopane woodlands.

Its name commemorates olympic sailor and ornithologist Berend Carp (1901-1966).

Carp's tit was formerly one of the many species in the genus Parus but was moved to Melaniparus after a molecular phylogenetic analysis published in 2013 showed that the members of the new genus formed a distinct clade.

References

External links
 (Carp's tit = ) Carp's black tit - Species text in The Atlas of Southern African Birds.

Carp's tit
Birds of Southern Africa
Carp's tit